Baixi Reservoir is a reservoir in Ninghai County, Ningbo City, Zhejiang Province, China, located in the middle reaches of the main stream of Baixi. It is a large (2) scale water conservancy hub project mainly for water supply and flood control, taking into account power generation and irrigation. It is Ningbo's main drinking water source.

Construction on the Baixi Reservoir started on December 31, 1996, and was completed on March 31, 2001.

Experts argued that in drought years, Baixi Reservoir can supply 173 million cubic meters of clear and high-quality raw water to Ningbo every year.

In 2001, Ningbo Tianhe Ecological Scenic Area, which is based on Baixi Reservoir, was named a National Water Conservancy Scenic Area by the Ministry of Water Resources of China.

References

Reservoirs in China
Buildings and structures in Zhejiang
Buildings and structures completed in 2001